Thomas Ryder (May 9, 1863 – July 18, 1935) was a 19th-century professional baseball outfielder. He played for the St. Louis Maroons of the Union Association in July and August 1884.

External links

1863 births
1935 deaths
Major League Baseball outfielders
St. Louis Maroons players
19th-century baseball players
Baseball players from Iowa
Sportspeople from Dubuque, Iowa